William McKinley Hutchison (December 6, 1944 – September 19, 2005), better known as Willie Hutch, was an American singer, songwriter as well as a record producer and recording artist for the Motown record label during the 1970s and 1980s.

Biography
Born in 1944 in Los Angeles, Hutch was raised in Dallas, Texas. He joined the high school choral group, The Ambassadors, as a teenager. After graduating from Booker T. Washington High School in 1962, he shortened his surname when he started his music career in 1964 on the Soul City label with the song "Love Has Put Me Down".

After his move to Los Angeles, his music came to the attention of the mentor for pop/soul quintet The 5th Dimension, and Hutch was soon writing, producing, and arranging songs for the group. In 1969, he signed with RCA Records and put out two albums before he was asked by Motown producer Hal Davis to write lyrics to "I'll Be There", a song he wrote for The Jackson 5. The song was recorded by the group the morning after Hutch received the call. Motown CEO Berry Gordy signed Hutch to be a staff writer, arranger, producer, and musician shortly thereafter.

Hutch later co-wrote songs that were recorded by the Jackson 5 and their front man Michael Jackson, Smokey Robinson, the Miracles, and Marvin Gaye. In 1973, Hutch started recording albums for Motown, releasing the Fully Exposed album that year. That same year, Hutch recorded and produced the soundtrack to the Blaxploitation film, The Mack. Hutch had several R&B hits during this period, including "Brother's Gonna Work It Out" and "Slick". He also recorded the soundtrack for the 1974 film Foxy Brown. He recorded at least six albums for Motown, peaking with 1975's single "Love Power", which reached number 41 on the Billboard Hot 100. He left Motown in 1977 for Norman Whitfield's Whitfield Records.

Hutch returned to Motown in 1982, where he scored the disco hit, "In and Out", that same year and also recorded a couple of songs – "The Glow" and "Inside You" – for the 1985 film The Last Dragon. He had a club hit with the song "Keep on Jammin'" as well. Hutch left Motown again by the end of the decade and by 1994 had moved back to Dallas.

He died in Dallas, Texas on September 19, 2005, aged 60. No cause was given when he died. He was the uncle of Cold 187um of the rap group Above the Law. His manager, Anthony Voyce, said of Hutch: "I've never met a more generous and caring person."

Discography

Studio albums

Compilation albums
 In and Out (1983)
 Try It You'll Like It (The Best of Willie Hutch) (2003)

Singles

References

External links
 
 

1944 births
2005 deaths
African-American guitarists
20th-century African-American male singers
African-American record producers
Record producers from Texas
African-American songwriters
American funk guitarists
American funk singers
American male guitarists
American rhythm and blues singer-songwriters
American soul guitarists
American soul singers
Motown artists
Musicians from Dallas
Singers from Los Angeles
Singer-songwriters from Texas
20th-century American singers
20th-century American guitarists
Guitarists from Los Angeles
Guitarists from Texas
Record producers from California
20th-century American male singers
21st-century African-American people
American male singer-songwriters
Singer-songwriters from California